The Extraordinary and Plenipotentiary Ambassador of Peru to the People's Democratic Republic of Algeria is the official representative of the Republic of Peru to the People's Democratic Republic of Algeria.

The ambassador in Algiers is accredited to Tunisia and, until 2010, Libya.

Peru and Algeria established diplomatic relations in 1972. Peru maintains an embassy in Algiers since the establishment of relations, which was once closed in 1990 until it reopened in 2005.

List of representatives

See also
List of ambassadors of Peru to Egypt
List of ambassadors of Peru to Kenya
List of ambassadors of Peru to South Africa

Notes

References

Algeria
Peru